In the United Kingdom, a Chartered Engineer (CEng) is an engineer registered with the UK's regulatory body for the engineering profession, the Engineering Council. Chartered Engineers are degree-qualified or can demonstrate equivalent work-based learning and have gained the appropriate professional competencies through education and working experience. Demonstration of competence is defined in the UK Standard for Professional Engineering Competence, assessed through professional review of academic qualifications and professional development (training and professional work experience). Formal, non-formal and informal learning can be assessed. The title Chartered Engineer is protected in the UK under law by means of the Engineering Council’s Royal Charter and Bye-laws. As of 2019 there are approximately 180,000 engineers registered as a Chartered Engineer. Chartered Engineers are registered through Professional Engineering Institutions (PEIs) licensed by the Engineering Council which are relevant to their industry or specialism. 

Many engineering tasks covered by UK legislation specify Chartership as a requirement of the persons undertaking them. For example The Road Tunnel Safety Regulations 2007 require that for inspections "The person appointed as the inspection entity must be a Chartered Engineer or headed by a Chartered Engineer". Others require chartered engineers be registered with a particular institution, for example The Energy Efficiency (Private Rented Property) (England and Wales) Regulations 2015 require assessments be carried out by a "chartered engineer...who is registered by the Institution of Civil Engineers".

History
In the 19th century Engineering as a profession was becoming prolific and various disciplines (principally Civil, Mechanical and Electrical) organised to form Institutions to further the interests of their members and the industry as a whole. At this time, each institution began to implement entry examinations for membership to ensure a minimum standard of competence of their members. In the Institution of Mechanical Engineers (IMechE), for example, candidates for Associate Membership would be expected to sit a general knowledge paper, a three-hour paper on applied mathematics, a three-hour paper on physics and chemistry and two three-hour papers elected from the following list: materials, steam engines, internal combustion engines, hydraulics, “electrotechnics”, the theory of machines, machine design and metallurgy. Membership of an engineering institution quickly became a mark of quality and would give employers confidence in the competency of its members. Various Institutions sought Royal Charter to formalise their position and the members became engineers by charter, or Chartered Engineers for that institutions discipline. The first was in 1828 when the Institute of Civil Engineers was awarded its Royal Charter (awarding Chartered Civil Engineer). On April 22nd 1930 King George V signed the IMechE’s Royal Charter allowing Members to refer to themselves as Chartered Mechanical Engineers. By the mid-1950s, a significant demand for a central body to set the standards for education and training and to represent the wider profession had arisen. This led to the creation of the Joint Council of Engineering Institutions, established in 1964, that was later known as the Council of Engineering Institutions (CEI). This body was empowered to imbue the title of Chartered Engineer to elected members of PEIs. Despite attempts in the 1970s to replace the title with REng (Registered Engineer), the title of Chartered Engineer remains the de facto mark of the professional engineer in the UK.

Election Requirements
To become chartered, the Engineering Council require engineers meet requirements set out in The UK Standard for Professional Engineering Competence and Commitment (UK-SPEC) which broadly fall into two categories, academic qualification and initial professional development (IPD).

Academic Qualifications
The UK-SPEC denotes the following academic qualification requirements (for the 'traditional' pathway):
An accredited Bachelor's degree with honours in engineering or technology, plus either an appropriate Master's degree or engineering doctorate accredited by a Licensee, or appropriate further learning to Masters level
An accredited integrated Master of Engineering (MEng) degree 
An accredited Bachelors degree with honours in engineering or technology started before September 1999 
Equivalent qualifications or apprenticeships accredited or approved by a Licensee, or at an equivalent level in a relevant national or international qualifications framework

Initial Professional Development
Initial Professional Development (IPD) is acquired through work place learning. The UK-SPEC splits IPD into five key competencies:

Competency A. Knowledge and understanding 
Chartered Engineers shall use a combination of general and specialist engineering knowledge and understanding to optimise the application of advanced and complex systems.

Competency B. Design, development and solving engineering problems
Chartered Engineers shall apply appropriate theoretical and practical methods to the analysis and solution of engineering problems.

Competency C. Responsibility, management and leadership 
Chartered Engineers shall demonstrate technical and commercial leadership.

Competency D. Communication and interpersonal skills
Chartered Engineers shall demonstrate effective communication and interpersonal skills.

Competency E. Personal and professional commitment
Chartered Engineers shall demonstrate a personal commitment to professional standards, recognising obligations to society, the profession and the environment.

Requirements specific to Institutions
The Engineering Council do not directly register Chartered Engineers. This task is delegated to Professional Engineering Institutions (PEIs). In addition to the key competencies set in the UK-SPEC, the PEI may have additional requirements for election to membership. For example, the Nuclear Institute (NI) requires demonstration of the key competencies, but also of the Nuclear Delta. According to the NI, the nuclear delta differentiates nuclear professionals from professionals in other fields and institutions. The Nuclear Delta® is defined by three core elements, which capture what is unique, special and different about the nuclear industry.

Nuclear Safety Culture    
Nuclear Security Culture      
Nuclear Technology & Safety

Maintenance Requirements
The Engineering Council requires demonstration of commitment and Continued Professional Development (CPD) for on-going registration as a chartered engineer. The Engineering Council sets out basic requirements and similar to IPD, CPD may be further enhanced by individual PEIs. The general requirements are:
Take ownership of their learning and development needs, and develop a plan to indicate how they might meet these, in discussion with their employer, as appropriate.

Undertake a variety of development activities, both in accordance with this plan and in response to other opportunities which may arise.
Record their CPD activities.
Reflect upon what they have learned or achieved through their CPD activities and record these reflections.
Evaluate their CPD activities against any objectives which they have set and record this evaluation.
Review their learning and development plan regularly following reflection and assessment of future needs.
Support the learning and development of others through activities such as mentoring, and sharing professional expertise and knowledge.

Designatory lettering
Chartered Engineers are entitled to use the post-nominals, CEng, after names as a means of denoting their status with the Engineering Council. This is written after honours, decorations and  academic/university, but before letters denoting membership of professional engineering institutions. When a Chartered Engineer has more than one institution membership conferring designatory letters, the institution through which the holder is registered as a Chartered Engineer appears immediately after CEng, with other memberships following in order of the institution's foundation dates.

International equivalence
The level of competence required for registration as a Chartered Engineer in the U.K. is comparable to many continental European countries that require master's-level education for registration as a professional Engineer. The Washington Accord, signed by the Engineering Council in 1989, recognises "substantial equivalence" between the academic requirements for registration between signatories, meaning that foreign qualifications recognised by their local signatory body are accepted for Chartered Engineers, and UK qualifications can be used in applying for similar international statuses. Recognition under the Washington Accord is outcome-based, not based on the length of courses.

Chartered Engineers are entitled to register through the European Federation of National Engineering Associations as a European Engineer and use the pre-nominal of EUR ING.

Bodies qualified to register Chartered Engineers
The body that maintains the UK's register of Chartered Engineers is the Engineering Council. Authority to register Chartered Engineers is delegated to licensed Professional Engineering Institutions (PEIs):

 Institute of Acoustics
 Royal Aeronautical Society
 Institution of Agricultural Engineers
 British Computer Society
 Chartered Association of Building Engineers
 Chartered Institution of Building Services Engineers
 Chartered Institution of Highways and Transportation
 Institute of Cast Metals Engineers
 Institution of Chemical Engineers
 Institution of Civil Engineers
 Energy Institute
 Institution of Engineering and Technology
 Institution of Engineering Designers
 Institute of Explosive Engineers (IExpE)
 Institution of Fire Engineers
 Institution of Gas Engineers and Managers
 Institute of Healthcare Engineering and Estate Management
 Institute of Highway Engineers
 Institution of Lighting Professionals
 Institute of Marine Engineering, Science and Technology
 Institute of Materials, Minerals and Mining
 Institute of Measurement and Control
 Institution of Mechanical Engineers
 Royal Institution of Naval Architects
 British Institute of Non-Destructive Testing
 Institution of Nuclear Engineers
 Society of Operations Engineers
 Institute of Physics
 Institute of Physics and Engineering in Medicine
 Institution of Railway Signal Engineers
 Institution of Royal Engineers
 The Safety and Reliability Society
 Institution of Structural Engineers
 Chartered Institution of Water and Environmental Management
 Institution of Water Officers
 The Welding Institute
 Chartered Institution of Civil Engineering Surveyors (CICES)
 (UK chapter of) International Council on Systems Engineering
 The Permanent Way Institution (PWI)

Some of these institutions also register Incorporated Engineers and Engineering Technicians.  There are other Engineering Council UK licensed member institutions that register Incorporated Engineers and Engineering Technicians, but do not register Chartered Engineers.

See also

Chartered Chemist
Chartered Environmentalist
Chartered IT Professional
Chartered Physicist
Chartered Mathematician
Chartered Scientist
 European Engineer (EUR ING)
Master of Engineering
Master of Science in Engineering
SQEP

References

External links
 A. & C. Black Staff. (2002).  Titles and Forms of Address, 21st edition.  A. & C. Black.  
 Engineering Council UK.  ECUK Institution Details. Retrieved 13 July 2007
 Engineering Council UK. FEANI Registration and the EurIng Title. Retrieved 13 July 2007
 Engineering Council UK. Register Sections. Retrieved 13 July 2007
 Institution of Engineering and Technology. Use of designatory letters. Retrieved 13 July 2007
 Institution of Engineering and Technology.  The Chartered Engineer Qualification. Retrieved 16 March 2015
 Engineering and Technology Board (UK)
 Engineering Council UK
 SCENTA (UK)

Professional certification in engineering
Engineer
Professional associations based in the United Kingdom